Cherry pit oil, also referred to as cherry kernel oil, is a seed oil that is derived from the pits of cherries. It is used for culinary purposes as a flavorant, as a fragrance and as an ingredient in cosmetics, such as lipstick.

Properties
The oil has a brownish to yellow color in its natural state, and after it is purified, its color is pale golden. It has been described as having a "nutty" odor.

Culinary uses
Culinary uses of cherry pit oil include serving as a flavorant in beverages, ice cream and condiments.

References

Further reading

 94 pages.

Cherries
Vegetable oils